Simplemente María (English: Simply María) is a Mexican telenovela produced by Ignacio Sada for Televisa. Based on an original story by the Argentine writer Celia Alcántara. It is a remake of the Mexican telenovela Simplemente María, produced in 1989. The series originally aired from November 9, 2015, to May 1, 2016.

The series stars Claudia Álvarez as María, José Ron as Alejandro and Ferdinando Valencia as Cristóbal.

Plot 
María, is a young, beautiful yet naïve woman. Maria fled her beloved hometown after being harassed by Isauro, a man that she does not want to be with. Upon arriving in Mexico City, Maria dazzles Alejandro Rivapalacio with her beauty; and the handsome medical student, heir and successor of the medical empire his family owns, sets out to conquer her at all cost.

María falls in love with Alejandro and becomes pregnant. Maria is excited and happy that she will have a baby and marry the man she loves. However, her hopes and dreams are dashed when she becomes aware that Alejandro is not willing to marry her. María resolves to move forward alone with her son, who will be her reason and motive to survive and conquer all obstacles in her way in order to become a high end fashion designer.

Twenty years go by and Cristóbal confesses his feelings to María but she no longer believes in love. Despite Maria's rejection Cristóbal decides to give María time to heal her wounds in the hopes he can convince her of his love. Alejandro returns to Maria's life and a love triangle ensues between them. Love rivals make every attempt to destroy Maria's chances at love and through all the adversity, tribulations and obstacles, Maria fights to reach her dreams of success and maybe even find true love.

Cast

Main 
 Claudia Álvarez as María Flores Ríos 
 José Ron as Alejandro Rivapalacio Landa
 Ferdinando Valencia as Cristóbal Cervantes Núñez
 Arleth Terán as Vanessa Rivapalacio Landa de Arenti 
 Ana Martín as Felicitas Núñez Vda. de Cervantes "Doña Feli" 
 Eleazar Gómez as Juan Pablo Flores Ríos / Juan Pablo Rivapalacio Flores 
 Alejandra Robles Gil as Lucía Arenti Rivapalacio

Secondary 

 Michelle Ramaglia as Crispina Jaramillo de Calleja "Pina" 
 Francisco Rubio as Marco Arenti Serrano
 Carmen Becerra as Karina Pineda Hurtado 
 Claudia Troyo as Estela Lozano
 Beatriz Moreno as Hortensia Miranda
 Carlos Bonavides as Inocencio Buenrostro Falcón
 Norma Herrera as Carmina
 Héctor Sáez as Zacarias Sánchez Mena
 Miguel Martínez as Fabián Garza Treviño 
 Daniela Basso as Yolanda Bustos de Garza
 Erik Díaz as Fausto Garza Treviño
 Mónica Sánchez Navarro as Georgina Landa Mendizábal de Rivapalacio 
 Silvia Manríquez as Marcela Arriaga
 Fernando Robles as Don Juan Flores 
 Ricardo Barona as Luis
 Óscar Ferreti as  Jiménez
 Josué Arévalo as Isauro Correa
 Benjamín Islas as Director
 Humberto Elizondo as Adolfo Rivapalacio Balaguer
 Ricardo Franco as Laureano Calleija
 Cinthia Aparicio as Coral Moreno Sánchez
 Roberto Romano as Gustavo "Tavo" Cervantes Núñez
 Jessica Diaz as Nayeli Cervantes Núñez
 Norma Lazareno as Olivia Aparicio Vda. de Bazaine
 Tania Lizardo as Magdalena Flores Ríos
 Vanessa Terkes as Sonia Aspíllaga   
 Claudia Ortega as Belén Sánchez
 Jonnathan Kuri as Conrado Ricalde
 Carlos Athié as Ulises Mérida
 Lore Graniewicz as Claudia Lascuráin
 Estefanía Romero as Dolores Serna
 Eduardo Shacklett as Eugenio Galindo
 Hugo Aceves as Tomás Flores Ríos
 Juan Pablo Rocha as Raúl
 Rebeca Gucón as Paloma Montesinos 
 Pietro Vannucci as Dr. Horacio De La Fuente
 Marychuy Aramburo as Zoé Garza Bustos
 Julio Vallado as Iván Sarabia
 Javier Ruán as Heriberto Rojas
 Arsenio Campos as Eugenio Ceniceros
 Eva Cedeño as Bertha de Mérida
 Elena Carrasco as Piedad
 Rebeca Mankita as Úrsula Lobato 
 Ewout Rischen as Didier
 Virginia Marín as Enriqueta "Queta"
 Rocío Lázaro as Norma
 Sergio Acosta as "El Zopilote"
 Marina Marín as Madre Superiora
 Amparo Garrido as Madre Benigna

Recurring 
 Marcelo Córdoba as Rodrigo Aranda
 Mariluz Bermúdez as Diana Bazaine Aparicio
 Roberto Blandón as Enrique Montesinos Villarnau
 Maricruz Nájera as Conchita
 Diana Golden as Thelma Lobato
 Lilia Aragón as Constanza Villarnau Vda. de Montesinos
 Óscar Bonfiglio as Lic. Castillo
 Patricio de la Garza as Martín
 Ana Paula Martínez as Lucía
 Fede Porras as Juan Pablo
 Miranda Kay as Nayeli
 Carlos Meza as Gustavo 
 Shaula Satinka as Coral
 Omar Yubelli as Gustavo 
 Salma Ponce de León as Coral 
 Sahit Sosa as Diego Flores Ríos

Guest stars 
 Zaide Silvia Gutiérrez as Zenaida Jaramillo
 Zuria Vega as Virginia Guerrero de Rivapalacio

Production

Casting 
The casting for the role of María began in June 2015 and participated actresses as Thelma Madrigal, Adriana Louvier, Claudia Álvarez, Danna García and Ariadne Díaz, the latter rejected the role because she had other plans. On July 9, 2015, producer Ignacio Sada confirmed that Claudia Álvarez will be the protagonist of the melodrama. The telenovela production began at the end of August 2015 and is expected to be released in November 2015.

Among the actors who made tests to be the protagonist of the novela are Andrés Palacios and Gabriel Soto. On August 7, 2015, it was confirmed that José Ron will be the protagonist of the story, together with Ferdinando Valencia as the co-protagonist.

Reception 
The series was released with a total of 13.5 of rating in its first chapter, Is the second telenovela of the Canal de las Estrellas less view for 2015.

Awards and nominations

References

External links 

Televisa telenovelas
Mexican telenovelas
2015 Mexican television series debuts
2016 Mexican television series endings
2015 telenovelas
Television series reboots
Spanish-language telenovelas